Gary Holmes may refer to:
 Gary Holmes (footballer)
 Gary Holmes (wrestler)